As of 2015, Tirukkural has been translated into Sinhalese at least twice.

Background
The first Sinhalese translation of the Tirukkural was made by Govokgada Misihamy, with the assistance of S. Thambaiah, in 1961 under the title Thiruvalluvar's Kural, who considered his translation an 'adaptation' rather than a translation for he believed that no translation of any classic into a foreign language can do justice to the original.

Another translation of the Kural text was made by Charles De Silva in 1964, which was published by the Sri Lanka Sahitya Mandalaya.

Translations

See also
 Tirukkural translations
 List of Tirukkural translations by language

References

External links
 

Sinhalese
Translations into Sinhala